Engure is a village in the northern part of Engure municipality, Latvia, at the sea shore of the Gulf of Riga. Engure is also the centre of Engure parish.

References

Towns and villages in Latvia